The sport of football in the country of Gabon is run by the Gabonese Football Federation. The association administers the national football team, as well as the national league. Football is the most popular sport in the country.

Gabon football stadiums 

A minimum capacity of 5,000 is required.

References